Frank Hamilton Funk (April 5, 1869 – November 24, 1940) was a U.S. Representative from Illinois, son of Benjamin F. Funk and grandson of Isaac Funk.

Born in Bloomington, McLean County, Illinois, Funk attended the public schools and the Illinois Normal School at Normal, Illinois. He was graduated from the Lawrenceville School, Lawrenceville, New Jersey, in 1888 and from Yale University in 1891. He engaged in agricultural pursuits and livestock production in Bloomington, Illinois, member of the Illinois Republican State central committee 1906-1912. He served as member of the State senate 1909-1911. He was an unsuccessful candidate of the Progressive Party for Governor of Illinois in 1912. He served as chairman of the Illinois delegation to the Progressive National Conventions in 1912 and 1916. He was an unsuccessful Progressive nominee for United States Senator in 1913. He served as commissioner on the Illinois Public Utilities Commission 1914-1921. He served as delegate to the Republican National Convention in 1920.

Funk was elected as a Republican to the Sixty-seventh, Sixty-eighth, and Sixty-ninth Congresses (March 4, 1921 – March 3, 1927). He was an unsuccessful candidate for renomination in 1926. He retired from public life and active business pursuits. He resided in Bloomington until his death there on November 24, 1940. He was interred in Funk's Grove Cemetery, Funk's Grove, Illinois.

References

1869 births
1940 deaths
Lawrenceville School alumni
Republican Party Illinois state senators
Illinois Progressives (1912)
Republican Party members of the United States House of Representatives from Illinois
Yale University alumni
People from Normal, Illinois